The Indira Gandhi Arena (officially Indira Gandhi Indoor Stadium), formerly known as the Indraprashtha Stadium, is located at the Indraprastha Estate in the eastern region of New Delhi. It is the largest indoor sports arena in India and among the largest in Asia. The multi-purpose arena is regularly used by tennis club Indian Aces and DSA Senior Division Futsal League.

History

Since its construction, the arena hosted a number of other tournaments as well. The facility seats 14,348 people and is named after former Prime Minister of India Indira Gandhi. The venue hosts several political events, music events and sports events like tennis and kabaddi.

Since its inception, the arena has been repeatedly renovated and modernized. Equipped with soundproof synthetics walls, lighting systems, and audio system, the arena underwent another renovation for the 2010 Commonwealth Games.

It was renovated for the 2010 Commonwealth Games at a cost of Rs. 240 crore.  

A new air-conditioned Velodrome has been built costing Rs 150 crore (U$33.76 million).

The stadium hosted matches of first ever International Premier Tennis League tournament played on 6 December 2014 to 8 December 2014. Tennis club Indian Aces are tenants.

Other facilities
There are 2 other venues located in the same complex with the arena:

Indira Gandhi Indoor Cycling Velodrome is a 3,800 seater velodrome that hosted track cycling events of 2010 Commonwealth Games.

The KD Jadhav Indoor Hall is a 6,000-capacity indoor stadium that hosted wrestling events for the 2010 Commonwealth Games. After three months without official name, it was finally named after Indian wrestler K. D. Jadhav who won Independent India's first individual medal at the Olympics i.e. a bronze medal at the 1952 Summer Olympics.

References

External links
 Indira Gandhi Indoor Stadium at Government of Delhi
 Commonwealth Games News
Facility information
 Commonwealth Games visitors website

Indoor arenas in India
2010 Commonwealth Games venues
Sports venues in Delhi
Venues of the 1982 Asian Games
Asian Games badminton venues
Monuments and memorials to Indira Gandhi
International Premier Tennis League
Sports venues completed in 1982
1982 establishments in Delhi
Judo venues
Commonwealth Games wrestling venues
20th-century architecture in India